Miklós Hodászy (10 October 1890 – 9 December 1975) was a Hungarian writer. His work was part of the literature event in the art competition at the 1932 Summer Olympics.

References

1890 births
1975 deaths
20th-century Hungarian male writers
Olympic competitors in art competitions
Writers from Budapest